The 2016 Silverstone GP3 Series round was a GP3 Series motor race held on 9 and 10 July 2016 at the Silverstone Circuit in the United Kingdom. It was the third round of the 2016 GP3 Series. The race weekend supported the 2016 British Grand Prix.

Background
It was announced that Arjun Maini would be replacing Oscar Tunjo at Jenzer Motorsport GP3 team for the Silverstone round.

Classification

Qualifying
In changing conditions, Alexander Albon prevailed an achieved his first pole position and the second for ART Grand Prix for the year. Being over seven-tenths faster than nearest competitor Charles Leclerc, it was a dominant display from Albon. Because of Leclerc's grid penalty, Sandy Stuvik will line up second on the grid, thereby making it the first ever all-Thai front row. Debutant Arjun Maini achieved a time of 1:48.393 to put himself third on the grid.

Notes
1. – Leclerc was given a five-place grid penalty for causing an avoidable collision at the previous round in Austria.
2. – Nandy was given a five-place grid penalty for exceeding the pitlane speed limit at the previous round in Austria.
3. – Ferrucci was handed a five-place grid penalty for impeding and causing a collision during the qualifying session. Seeing as how he could not carry out this penalty in full, he started from the pitlane.

Race 1
It was a dominant performance from Albon from the start of the race, with him maintaining the lead with a comfortable buffer over the rest of the pack. The race began to settle toward the middle of the race, with Stuvik falling back through the pack and Leclerc started to chase after his teammate. Jake Hughes was on a charge, but after a rear wing failure, he was forced to retire after running as high as fourth. Matt Parry was also on a charge, with him climbing from 12th on the grid, although he found himself hounded by Nyck de Vries who had started from 19th. However, at the front, Albon was victorious from teammate Leclerc and Antonio Fuoco.

Notes
1. – Janosz was given a five-second penalty for excessive over-use of track limits.
2. – Dennis was given a five-second penalty for excessive over-use of track limits.

Race 2

Standings after the round

Drivers' Championship standings

Teams' Championship standings

 Note: Only the top five positions are included for both sets of standings.

See also 
 2016 British Grand Prix
 2016 Silverstone GP2 Series round

References

External links 
 Official website of GP3 Series

|- style="text-align:center"
|width="35%"|Previous race:
|width="30%"|GP3 Series2016 season
|width="40%"|Next race:

Silverstone
Silverstone
Silverstone